Gangstress is the second studio album by American rapper Khia. The album was released by Thug Misses Entertainment and Warlock Records on July 11, 2006 in the United States. The album was fully produced by Khia. It debuted at #67 on the Billboard'''s Top R&B/Hip-Hop Albums chart. 

Release
The release party for Gangstress was hosted at BED, a New York City nightclub featuring mattresses scattered around the space.

Chart performanceGangstress debuted at number 67 on the Billboard Top R&B/Hip-Hop Albums chart dated July 29, 2006. It spent a total of three weeks on the chart, compared to 29 and 20 weeks, respectively, for the two editions of her debut album. The album did not enter the Billboard 200, in contrast to Thug Misses'', which had peaked within the top 40.

Track listing
All songs written by Khia Chambers
 "Answering Machine" – 3:40
 "Respect Me" – 4:49
 "Thugmisses Speaks, Pt. 1" – 0:19
 "Bitch Muthafucka Got Damn" – 4:10
 "Grandma" – 1:00
 "Ah Ha" – 3:50
 "I've Been High" – 4:02
 "Thugmisses Speaks, Pt. 2" – 0:15
 "I've Been Called a Bitch" – 4:14
 "Pop's" – 2:11
 "Thugmisses Thugniggaz" – 4:36
 "Sunshine" – 1:12
 "Fucking Me Tonight" – 4:11
 "Questions for the Niggaz" – 0:39
 "Snatch the Cat Back" – 4:32
 "Insufficient Funds" – 1:10
 "Bryan Brooks" – 2:56
 "Hit the Door" – 4:23
 "Thugmisses Speaks, Pt. 3" – 0:13
 "Don't Trust" – 4:11
 "Thugmisses Speaks, Pt. 4" – 0:13
 "For the Love of Money" – 4:20
 "Forgive Me for My Sins" – 5:12

Bonus DVD
"Khia Live" (featuring Khia performing her hits live)
 "Photoshoot"
 "On the Radio" (Interview)
 "Back to T-Town" ("Memory Lane")
 "Interview"

Charts

Personnel
Khia – rapping
JA – rapping on "Hit the Door"

References

External links
[ Gangstress track listing at Billboard.com]
[ Gangstress chart history at Billboard.com]

2006 albums
2006 live albums
2006 video albums
Khia albums
Live video albums
RED Distribution albums